Doumea skeltoni is a species of catfish in the genus Doumea. It lives in the Loémé and Kouilou-Niari rivers in the Republic of the Congo. Its length reaches 4.5 cm. It is named after South African ichthyologist Paul H. Skelton.

References 

Amphiliidae
Freshwater fish of Africa
Fish described in 2014